Milan Lešnjak (born 9 September 1975) is a Serbian football manager and former player. He is an assistant coach of Čukarički.

Career
During his playing career, Lešnjak represented Red Star Belgrade, Obilić, Club Brugge and Saturn Ramenskoye. He was also capped for FR Yugoslavia at under-21 level.

In 2013, Lešnjak served as manager of Napredak Kruševac. He was appointed manager of Čukarički in March 2016.

Honours
Obilić
 First League of FR Yugoslavia: 1997–98
Club Brugge
 Belgian Cup: 2001–02
 Belgian Super Cup: 1998

References

External links
 
 

Association football defenders
Belgian Pro League players
Club Brugge KV players
Expatriate footballers in Belgium
Expatriate footballers in Russia
FC Saturn Ramenskoye players
First League of Serbia and Montenegro players
FK Čukarički managers
FK Napredak Kruševac managers
FK Obilić players
FK Rudar Pljevlja managers
Footballers from Belgrade
Red Star Belgrade footballers
Red Star Belgrade non-playing staff
Russian Premier League players
Serbia and Montenegro expatriate footballers
Serbia and Montenegro expatriate sportspeople in Belgium
Serbia and Montenegro expatriate sportspeople in Russia
Serbia and Montenegro footballers
Serbia and Montenegro under-21 international footballers
Serbian football managers
Serbian footballers
Serbian SuperLiga managers
1975 births
Living people